The Alexis Nakota Sioux Nation no. 437 is a Nakoda First Nation which reserves near Edmonton, Hinton, and Whitecourt, in the Canadian province of Alberta, and headquartered at 54° N and 114°, about  west of Edmonton.  The Alexis Nakota Sioux Nation is a member of Treaty 6.

Reserves

Demographics
As of March, 2019, the total registered population of the Alexis Nakota Sioux Nation is 2036 persons.  There are 508 registered males, and 459 females living on their own reserve.

Members of the Alexis First Nation are of the "Stoney" or "Nakoda" ethnic group.  The Stoney are sometimes considered part of the Assiniboine. Both of the terms "Stoney" and "Assiniboine" stem from outsider's descriptions of how those peoples cooked by using heated stones (Assiniboine is from Ojibwe language asinii meaning "stoney" and bwaan meaning "cooker"). Their traditional language is Nakoda/Stoney, known natively as I'sga I?abi.

Government
Alexis Nakota Sioux Nation has a custom electoral system based on section 10 of the Indian Act.  Current chief and council were elected on June 14, 2022, and will hold their positions until June 17, 2026.

Events

Pow-wow/Fastpitch tournament

The Alexis Annual Pow-wow Celebrations and Fastpitch Tournament is held on the Alexis reserve each summer in July. 
The Fastpitch tournament draws prizes of about $14,000 depending on the number of teams entered.  The Pow-wow is generally divided into various categories, such as a drum contest and dance contests based on ages and/or styles.  Competitors from many different First Nations participate.

Lac Ste. Anne Pilgrimage
The main townsite is located on the shores of Lac Ste. Anne, which the Nakota Sioux call Wakâmne, or God's lake.  Every summer there is a pilgrimage to the lake which is attended by up to 40,000 over four days, most of First Nations and Métis descent.

See also
List of Indian reserves in Alberta

References

External links
Alexis Nakota Sioux Nation homepage
  Stoney Language Department of the Alexis Nation. Seasons
 Stoney Language Department of the Alexis Nation. Family

Nakoda (Stoney)
First Nations governments in Alberta